Tianjin Renmin Guangbo Diantai, translated as the Tianjin People's Broadcasting Station (TPBS) is a major radio broadcaster in Tianjin, China.  They also operate the Tianjin Television station, also known as TJTV. Tianjin Television (TJTV) is a television network in the city of Tianjin, China.  Its official website is called Tianshi Wang. Popular TV programs on TJTV include "Foreigners in China", "This Week", "Xiaomi Helping You", and "Carnival".  
Tianjin Renmin Guangbo Diantai and Tianjin Television together forms Tianjin Television and Radio Station.

List of Tianjin Radio Stations

List of TJTV channels

 Tianjin Satellite Channel
 Tianjin News Channel
 Tianjin Art Channel
 Tianjin Drama Channel
 Tianjin City Channel
 Tianjin Sports Channel
 Tianjin Science and Education Channel
 Tianjin Children's Channel
 Sanjia Shopping Channel

Former TJTV channels 
 Tianjin Public Channel - Stopped airing on January 1, 2020
 Tianjin International Channel - Stopped airing on June 27, 2018

Sources

External links
 Official Website
 Official Website (translated to English with Babelfish)
Source: Pinyin translated by Cozy Website
Official Site 

Television networks in China
Television channels and stations established in 1960
Mass media in Tianjin
Chinese-language radio stations
Mandarin-language radio stations
Radio stations in China